The Natzschung is a river in Bohemia (Czech Republic) and Saxony (Germany). It is a left tributary of the Flöha, which it joins in Olbernhau. For much of its length it forms the border between Czech Republic and Germany.

See also
List of rivers of Saxony
List of rivers of the Czech Republic

Rivers of Saxony
Rivers of the Ústí nad Labem Region
Rivers of the Ore Mountains
Rivers of Germany
International rivers of Europe
Border rivers
Czech Republic–Germany border